The Nokia 6760 Slide is a Symbian Series 60 mobile phone, unveiled in July 2009. One of its main selling points was its SMS messaging capabilities.

The phone was listed as a Messaging phone. It was also good for internet browsing, but was criticized for lacking .

Nokia 6790 Surge (also known as Nokia Surge) was a US sibling of Nokia 6760 slide.

Features
Designed for messaging on the move, the 6760 slide sports a full slide-out QWERTY keyboard.

Nokia messaging was standard which gave access to a range of popular email services, along with Mail for Exchange support and Message Reader. Google Talk and Windows Live Instant Messaging services were supported. It offered access to Facebook, Twitter and MySpace.

Availability
The 6760 slide was released during the third quarter of 2009 for €199 before subsidies and taxes. It was  initially available in black.

References

Nokia smartphones
Mobile phones with an integrated hardware keyboard
Slider phones
Mobile phones introduced in 2009